Reinado Internacional del Café 2012, was held in Manizales, Colombia, on January 8, 2012. 24 beauty queens competed for the title.- The winner was Ximena Vargas, from Bolivia.

Results

Placements

Special awards

Official Contestants

Crossovers

Contestants who previously competed or will compete at other beauty pageants:

Miss International 2006
 - Emily Ann Kiss
Miss Tourism International 2009
 - Ximena Vargas
Miss International 2010
 - Ximena Vargas
 - Johanna Acs
Semifinalist
Miss World 2011
 - Bessy Beatriz Ochoa
Miss International 2011
 - Catherine Mabel Ramírez
Miss Intercontinental 2011
 - Clara Silvana Carrillo
Miss World 2012
 - Gabriela Ferrari
Miss Coffee International 2012
 - Johanna Acs
 - Catherine Ramírez (Winner)

References

External links
 Instituto de Cultura y Turismo de Manizales
 Alcaldía de Manizales
 Feria de Manizales
 Miss Venezuela La Nueva Era MB

2012
2012 beauty pageants
2012 in Colombia
January 2012 events in South America